Moons are celestial bodies that orbit planets or smaller bodies.

Moons may also refer to:
 Moonmoon, a "moon of a moon"
 Moons of moons, a "satellite of a satellite"
 7805 Moons, a main-belt asteroid
 Ellen Moons, Belgian materials scientist
 Jan Moons (born 1970), Belgian footballer
 Harvey balls, ideograms used for comparing qualitative information

See also
Moon (disambiguation)
Mooning